Mimachrostia novofasciata is a moth of the family Erebidae first described by Michael Fibiger in 2010. It is known from Hainan in China.

References

Micronoctuini
Moths described in 2010